Lloyd Leonard Winston (born September 22, 1939) is a former American football fullback who played college football for USC and professional football in the National Football League (NFL) for the San Francisco 49ers during the 1962 and 1963 seasons.

Early years
Winston attended Merced High School in Merced, California. As a running back at Merced, he was known as "hell on wheels" and a back who "defenders just bounced off."

He played college football at Santa Monica City College and the University of Southern California. In 1958, he rushed for 126 yards on 20 carries in a 30–12 upset victory over Oklahoma A&M, breaking the latter program's 19-game win streak. His college career was cut short by a severe knee injury sustained during his junior year at USC.

Professional football
He later played professional football for the San Francisco 49ers during the 1962 and 1963 seasons. He appeared in a total of six NFL games, four of them as a starter, and totaled 112 rushing yards and one touchdown. He was released by the 49ers in October 1963.

He signed with the San Diego Chargers in May 1964, and then signed with the Oakland Raiders in July 1964.

Later years
After his football career ended, Winston served with the San Francisco Police Department from 1966 to 1998.

References

1939 births
Living people
People from Merced, California
American football fullbacks
San Francisco 49ers players
USC Trojans football players
Players of American football from California